The Central Fulton School District covers the Borough of McConnellsburg and Ayr Township, Licking Creek Township and Todd Township in Fulton County, Pennsylvania. According to 2000 federal census data, it serves a resident population of 6,075.

Schools
McConnellsburg Elementary School Grades K–5
McConnellsburg Middle School Grades 6–8
McConnellsburg High School Grades 9–12

Extracurriculars
The district's students have access to a variety of clubs, activities and sports.

Athletics
 Baseball - Class A
 Basketball - Class A
 Soccer - Class A/AA
 Softball - Class A
 Track and field - Class AA
 Volleyball - Class A

References

External links
 Central Fulton School District
 PIAA

School districts in Fulton County, Pennsylvania